Transfort is the public transportation operator for Fort Collins, Colorado. The system offers 22 regular routes, with 20 of them providing all-day service Monday through Friday. Six-day intercity service is provided by the FLEX to Loveland, Berthoud, and Longmont. Additionally, five routes for transporting Colorado State University students, faculty and staff run throughout the school year. In , the system provided transportation services to  people.

Since 2014, Transfort has operated a bus rapid transit service, known as MAX, between South Transit Center and Downtown Fort Collins.

Route details 
Note: Some routes may be suspended, operating less frequently, or on reduced span due to the ongoing COVID-19 pandemic.

Former Routes:
Route 1: Front Range Community College to Downtown Transit Center via College Ave. Replaced by MAX Bus Rapid Transit.
Route 4: CSU Transit Center to LaPorte and Taft Hill via. Loomis, Mountain, & Mulberry.
Route 11 (old): CSU Transit Center West Loop along Plum St. Replaced by Route 31.
Route 15: CSU Transit Center to Downtown Transit Center via Howes St. Replaced by MAX Bus Rapid Transit
Route 17: Fossil Ridge HS to Prospect Park via Timberline Rd.
Route 91: Lincoln Middle School to Downtown. School Tripper.
Foxtrot: Regional Service between South Fort Collins and Loveland. Replaced by the FLEX.
Green: Late night shuttle launched accompanying the remaining Gold route.

Other routes

FLEX 

FLEX is a regional route with local and express service connecting Fort Collins, Loveland, Berthoud, Longmont, as well as limited weekday rush hour service to Boulder.

MAX BRT 

The Mason Corridor Express (MAX) BRT opened on May 10, 2014.

MAX Bus Rapid Transit (BRT) service runs along the Mason Corridor to connect and serves major activity and employment centers including Midtown, CSU and Downtown. MAX links with other Transfort bus routes, Park-n-Rides, the City's bicycle/pedestrian trail system, and other local and regional transit routes.

MAX's system has a dedicated transit-only guideway that runs parallel to the Burlington Northern Santa Fe Railway between the South Transit Center (south of Harmony Road) and Horsetooth Road, then again between Drake Road and University Avenue (CSU). The exclusive guideway is an integral part of MAX BRT service.

Fleet 
Transfort has a fleet of around 50 buses.
Gillig Low Floor BRT 35'(CNG)
Gillig Low Floor BRT 40'(CNG)
Gillig Low Floor BRT 40'(BEV)
NABI LFW 31' (CNG powered)
NABI LFW 35' (CNG powered)
NABI LFW 40' (CNG powered), used for FLEX regional bus service and busier bus routes
NABI BRT 60' (CNG powered), used for MAX service

Standard buses have 3-bike front racks, while MAX buses have interior racks for four bikes.

Transit centers 
Downtown Transit Center (Cherry and Mason Streets)
CSU Transit Center (Lory Student Center)
Mall Transfer Point (Foothills Mall)
South Transit Center (Harmony and College)

References 

Transportation in Fort Collins, Colorado
Bus transportation in Colorado
Transportation in Larimer County, Colorado